The ČSD Class 387.0 were 4-6-2 express passenger steam locomotives operated by the Czechoslovak State Railways (Československé státní dráhy, ČSD) between 1926 and 1974. Forty-three of these  pacific locomotives were built by the Škoda Works, Plzeň in five series between 1926 and 1937, intended for the heaviest long-distance express trains.

History 
The Czechoslovak state railway looked attentively at the operating and service costs, and decided to order a three-cylinder single-expansion engine with axle load up to 16 tonnes, which could operate on all main lines. The result didn't exactly meet the original proposal, because of a higher axle load (17 tonnes), but the locomotive was great step forward in the construction of steam locomotives in Czechoslovakia.

Design 

The frame is of the girder type, cast of vanadium steel. The twin-axle leading bogie has side play of ±, the rear truck of Adams type ±. The springs of the coupled axles and trailing truck are mounted above the axle boxes and are mutually joined by means of rockers.

The three cylinder steam engine has cranks arranged at ±120° and the central cylinder has inclination 1:10. Pistons and piston valves are made of aluminium and have hollow rods for to keep the weight in desirable limits. The boost compensator was self-acting, Winterthur type.

The valve gear is of the Heusinger type, with internal link motion driven by flycrank on the left wheel of the rear coupled axle. This arrangement proved itself very reliable in contrast to maintenance problems with the Gresley conjugated valve gear and was used for all subsequent Czechoslovak three-cylinder locomotives except of one series (Class 486.1).

The steam dome with throttle valve was on the first boiler ring and was cowled together with pneumatically operated sandbox.

The first batch (Nos 1 to 6) had the vacuum brake and the air-compressed brake for both the locomotive and train as well ; subsequent batches (1930 onwards) were fitted without vacuum brake. Tachometer was of Hausshälter-Rezsny type, the lighting by means of acetylene, which changed from the second batch (Nos 7 to 11) to TELOC tachometer and electric lighting. Other changes and improvements were:

From the third batch onwards: (Nos 12 to 21) there were four arch tubes in the firebox, hence the heating surface got larger to 
From the third batch onwards: large tube superheater was used  with heating surface .
From the third batch onwards: the cylindrical boiler had 126 large flue-tubes and 35 small flue-tubes with heating surface .
From the third batch onwards: smoke deflectorswere fitted , as seen on the picture.

As the locomotives progressed through the workshops for repairs all of these improvements were retrofitted.

Piston valves were newly of Trofimov type and except of Nos 13, 14, 16, 18, 24, 26, 32, 34, 35, 36, 37, 38, 39 and 43 were Kylchap exhaust system fitted.

According to Mr. František Vrátil, former dispatcher in Choceň, the class was able to reach . The class is said to have been 'among the most successful locomotives' in Europe. The locomotives started to be retired in 1967, with last one being retired in 1974. One example, 387.043, has been preserved.

Tenders were of series 923.0, 930.0 and 930.1

Sources 

387
4-6-2 locomotives
Railway locomotives introduced in 1926
Standard gauge locomotives of Czechoslovakia
Steam locomotives of Czechoslovakia
Škoda locomotives
2′C1′ h3 locomotives